is a former Japanese footballer.

Club career
Seita played for Spanish side Español Sociedad Deportiva from 1999 until 2003. In 2003, he went on trial with professional side Racing de Ferrol.

Seita became the first Asian footballer in Venezuela when he joined Primera División side Deportivo Italchaco in 2003. He later joined Portuguese side Valdevez from Almeira.

Career statistics

Club

Notes

References

1980 births
Living people
Association football people from Kanagawa Prefecture
Japanese footballers
Association football midfielders
Japanese expatriate footballers
Japanese expatriate sportspeople in Spain
Expatriate footballers in Spain
Expatriate footballers in Venezuela
Japanese expatriate sportspeople in Portugal
Expatriate footballers in Portugal